Cladonia subradiata is a widely distributed species of fruticose lichen in the family Cladoniaceae. It is found in Asia, Africa, Melanesia, Australia, New Zealand, and South, Central, and North America.

Taxonomy
The lichen was originally described as a variety of Cladonia fimbriata by Finnish lichenologist Edvard August Vainio in 1894. German botanist Heinrich Sandstede promoted it to distinct species status in 1922.

Description
Cladonia subradiata has a scaly primary thallus that is small and stands erect. Apothecia are scarce; when present, they are reddish or brown, and spherical. In terms of lichen spot tests, Cladonia subradiata is PD+ red and K−. It contains the lichen substances protocetraric acid, fumarprotocetraric acid, ursolic acid, and the chemically uncharacterized compounds called Cph-1 and Cph-2.

Cladonia subradiata has been confused with Cladonia balfourii; these species can be separated by chemistry. According to Index Fungorum, however, these species are synonymous.

Habitat and distribution
This species is widely distributed in Central and South America, extending to North Carolina in North America. In South America the lichen has been collected from Brazil, Chile, Argentina, Paraguay, and Guyana. It has also been recorded from Asia, Africa, Papua New Guinea, New Caledonia, Australia, and New Zealand. Cladonia subradiata grows in primary montane rainforests, preferring substrates such as humus and boulders.

See also
List of Cladonia species

References

subradiata
Lichen species
Taxa named by Edvard August Vainio
Lichens described in 1894
Lichens of Africa
Lichens of Asia
Lichens of Australia
Lichens of Central America
Lichens of North America
Lichens of New Zealand
Lichens of Oceania
Lichens of New Guinea
Lichens of South America